The 2013 Incarnate Word Cardinals football team represented the University of the Incarnate Word in the 2013 NCAA Division I FCS football season. The Cardinals played their first season of a transition to the FCS level. However, they were not considered a FCS team for scheduling purposes until 2014. They were led by second-year head coach Larry Kennan. Home games were played at Gayle and Tom Benson Stadium. This was a transition season for the Cardinals. As a transitioning school from D2 to D1, the Cardinals were ineligible for the FCS Playoffs and the D2 playoffs. They played a mixed schedule of schools from the FCS, NAIA, and D-II. The Cardinals joined the Southland Conference for football in the 2014 season, and it counted as the 2nd year in a 4-year transition into the D1 level that will make them eligible for the FCS Playoffs in 2017–18. They finished the season 6–5.

Schedule

*Tape delayed broadcast

Game summaries

Central Arkansas

Sources: Box Score

Texas College

Sources:

Langston

Sources:

Sam Houston State

Sources:

Eastern New Mexico

Sources:

Southeastern Louisiana

Sources:

Abilene Christian

Sources:

Houston Baptist

Sources:

McMurry

Sources:

Abilene Christian
Sources:

Angelo State

Sources:

Audio streaming
All Incarnate Word games were broadcast on KKYX with the voices of Gabe Farias and Shawn Morris. KKYX's broadcasts were available at their website. KUIW Radio produced a student media broadcast every week, that is available online, and they provided streaming of all non-televised home games were shown via UIW TV.

References

Incarnate Word
Incarnate Word Cardinals football seasons
Incarnate Word Cardinals football